Benjamin Zander (born 9 March 1939 in Gerrards Cross, Buckinghamshire, England) is an English conductor, who is currently the musical director of the Boston Philharmonic Orchestra and the Boston Philharmonic Youth Orchestra.

Biography

Benjamin Zander was born in Gerrards Cross, Buckinghamshire, England. His parents, Walter and Margarete (Gretl) Zander, had emigrated from Berlin in 1937 to escape the Nazis, and raised their four children: Michael, Luke, Angelica, and Benjamin.
At home, his father would regularly sing and play piano after work. 

Benjamin Zander started to compose music at the age of nine. Several of his compositions came to the attention of composer Benjamin Britten, who invited the Zander family to spend three summers in Aldeburgh, England, the beautiful seaside town in Suffolk where he lived.
Benjamin Zander took lessons with Benjamin Britten and became a student of theory of Britten's amanuensis and assistant, Imogen Holst.

Early life
Zander's main instrument was the cello. He began studying at the age of 10 and became the youngest member of the National Youth Orchestra of Great Britain at the age of 12. He went as a boarder at Uppingham School, as a music scholar at the age of 13 and thence attended St Paul's School, London so he could continue his cello studies with Herbert Withers.

At the age of 15, Zander became a student of the Spanish cello virtuoso Gaspar Cassadó and moved to Florence and Siena, Italy for the next three years. He completed his cello studies at the State Conservatoire in Cologne, Germany where he served as an assistant to Cassadó.

After living abroad for five years, Zander returned to England, completed his A levels and studied at University College London for a degree in English Literature, winning the University-wide English Literature Essay Prize.
During his period of study at University, he performed regularly as a cellist, giving recitals and chamber music concerts with the King-Zander-Arieli Trio and taught at the Yehudi Menuhin School for gifted children.

In 1965, he won a Harkness International Fellowship and travelled to the United States for graduate work at Brandeis University, Harvard University and with Leonard Shure and Ernst Oster in New York.

New England Conservatory
In 1967, Zander joined the faculty of the New England Conservatory of Music and remained on the faculty until 2012. In July 2012, the New England Conservatory and Preparatory School conferred on him the title of Faculty Emeritus, acknowledging his significant contributions to the school over 45 years. 

This followed his dismissal in January 2012 for negligence amid allegations he had hired a videographer to record concerts, who had (to Zander's knowledge) previously served a prison sentence for sexual assault of a minor. Zander later acknowledged that hiring the videographer, Peter Benjamin, without informing school administrators was a "significant oversight".

Boston Philharmonic
Benjamin Zander is the Conductor and Music Director of the Boston Philharmonic Youth Orchestra, a youth orchestra in Boston comprising both high school and college age students. The BPYO rehearses at The Benjamin Franklin Institute of Technology in Boston's South End. Their premiere performance took place in Symphony Hall on 25 November 2012. On the program was Strauss' Ein Heldenleben, Beethoven's Egmont Overture, and Elgar's Cello Concerto with Alisa Weilerstein as soloist.
BPYO's first international tour took place the summer of 2013 as the entire orchestra visited The Netherlands to play Mahler's Second Symphony in the Concertgebouw.

Personal life

Benjamin and Patricia Zander were married in 1966. They have one child, a daughter, Jessica.   Jessica and her husband David Tomaszewski have two daughters.

References

Interviews
 Interview with Charlie Rose
 
 
 TED Talk: "The transformative power of classical music" (TED2008)

External links

 Official site
 Benjamin Zander Profile Page
 
 Online Interpretation Classes

People from Gerrards Cross
English conductors (music)
British male conductors (music)
British expatriate academics in the United States
English Jews
Jewish English musicians
Alumni of University College London
Harvard University people
1939 births
Living people
21st-century British conductors (music)
21st-century British male musicians